is a Japanese professional track cyclist. He has collected five Asian Championships and two Asian Games medals to his career hardware in men's sprint, and later represented Japan at the 2008 Summer Olympics. Kitatsuru currently races for the Japan Professional Cycling Union.

Emerging as one of Japan's most successful sprinters in track cycling, Kitatsuru sought sporting headlines at the 2006 Asian Games in Doha, where he defeated South Korea's Choi Lae-Seon in the decided with a best time of 10.882 seconds, making him the fifth Japanese rider in the Games' history to take home the men's sprint gold.

Kitatsuru qualified for his first Japanese squad, as a 23-year-old, in the men's sprint at the 2008 Summer Olympics in Beijing by receiving one of the team's four available berths based on UCI's selection process from the Track World Rankings. Kitatsuru lost his round-of-sixteen match-up against France's Mickaël Bourgain, and finished second in his repechage heat behind Malaysia's Azizulhasni Awang, thus eliminating him from the tournament. Earlier in the morning session, Kitatsuru grabbed a fourteenth seed with a time of 10.391.

At the 2010 Asian Games in Guangzhou, Kitatsuru missed his title defense to settle only for the silver medal in men' sprint, after losing out to host nation China's Zhang Lei on a two-race final match.

Career highlights

2003
  UCI Junior Track World Championships (Keirin), Moscow (RUS)
  UCI Junior Track World Championships (Sprint), Moscow (RUS)
2004
  Asian Championships (Sprint), Yokkaichi, Mie (JPN)
2005
  Asian Championships (Sprint), Ludhiana (IND)
  Asian Championships (Keirin), Ludhiana (IND)
2006
  Asian Championships (Sprint), Kuala Lumpur (MAS)
  Asian Games (Sprint), Doha (QAT)
2007
  Asian Championships (Sprint), Kuala Lumpur (MAS)
 23rd UCI World Championships (Sprint), Palma de Mallorca (ESP)
2008
 14th Olympic Games (Sprint),  Beijing (CHN)
2010
  Asian Games (Sprint), Guangzhou (CHN)
2011
  Asian Championships (Sprint), Nakhon Ratchasima (THA)
 13th UCI World Championships (Sprint), Apeldoorn (NED)

References

External links
NBC 2008 Olympics profile

1985 births
Living people
Japanese male cyclists
Japanese track cyclists
Cyclists at the 2008 Summer Olympics
Cyclists at the 2006 Asian Games
Cyclists at the 2010 Asian Games
Asian Games medalists in cycling
Olympic cyclists of Japan
Sportspeople from Kitakyushu
Asian Games gold medalists for Japan
Asian Games silver medalists for Japan
Medalists at the 2006 Asian Games
Medalists at the 2010 Asian Games